Justice Penmetsa Satyanarayana Raju B.A., B.L. (17 August 1908 – 20 April 1966) was Chief Justice of Andhra Pradesh High Court.

He was born on 17 August 1908 at Ajjaram village in Tanuku taluk in West Godavari district of Andhra Pradesh, India. His parents are P. Ramabhadra Raju and Subhadramma. He is their eldest son and has two brothers and sisters.

He was educated in Board High School, Tanuku, West Godavari District and Intermediate in Vizianagaram. He did graduation Bachelor of Arts (B.A.) from Maharajah's College, Vizianagaram. He did Bachelor of Law (B.L.) Degree from Madras Law College and joined the Madras Bar in 1930. He was associated with late Sri T. Prakasam for 3 years and later with Sri P. Satyanarayana Rao. He became the Government Pleader of the Composite state of Madras in 1950 and State Counsel in 1951. When Andhra State was formed he became the Government Pleader of Andhra State in 1953.

He has visited Russia in 1964-65 along with the Chief Justice of Supreme Court P. B. Gajendragadkar to study their Legal system.
            
He was appointed Judge, Supreme Court of India on 20 October 1965. He died in harness on 20 April 1966 in New Delhi.

References

1908 births
1966 deaths
Telugu people
Justices of the Supreme Court of India
Chief Justices of the Andhra Pradesh High Court
20th-century Indian judges
People from West Godavari district
People from Andhra Pradesh